Enterotoxigenic Escherichia coli (ETEC) is a type of Escherichia coli and one of the leading bacterial causes of diarrhea in the developing world, as well as the most common cause of travelers' diarrhea. Insufficient data exists, but conservative estimates suggest that each year, about 157,000 deaths occur, mostly in children, from ETEC. A number of pathogenic isolates are termed ETEC, but the main hallmarks of this type of bacteria are expression of one or more enterotoxins and presence of fimbriae used for attachment to host intestinal cells. The bacteria was identified by the Bradley Sack lab in Kolkata in 1968.

Signs and symptoms
Infection with ETEC can cause profuse, watery diarrhea with no blood or leukocytes and abdominal cramping. Fever, nausea with or without vomiting, chills, loss of appetite, headache, muscle aches and bloating can also occur, but are less common.

Enterotoxins
Enterotoxins produced by ETEC include heat-labile enterotoxin (LT) and heat-stable enterotoxin (ST).

Prevention 
To date,  no licensed vaccines specifically target ETEC, though several are in various stages of development. Studies indicate that protective immunity to ETEC develops after natural or experimental infection, suggesting that vaccine-induced ETEC immunity should be feasible and could be an effective preventive strategy. Prevention through vaccination is a critical part of the strategy to reduce the incidence and severity of diarrheal disease due to ETEC, particularly among children in low-resource settings. The development of a vaccine against this infection has been hampered by technical constraints, insufficient support for coordination, and a lack of market forces for research and development. Most vaccine development efforts are taking place in the public sector or as research programs within biotechnology companies. ETEC is a longstanding priority and target for vaccine development for the World Health Organization.

Management
Treatment for ETEC infection includes rehydration therapy and antibiotics, although ETEC is frequently resistant to common antibiotics. Improved sanitation is also key. Since the transmission of this bacterium is fecal contamination of food and water supplies, one way to prevent infection is by improving public and private health facilities. Another simple prevention of infection is by drinking factory bottled water—this is especially important for travelers and traveling military—though it may not be feasible in developing countries, which carry the greatest disease burden.

See also
 Gastroenteritis

References

External links 

 US Centers for Disease Control and Prevention: Enterotoxigenic Escherichia coli
 Vaccine Resource Library: Shigellosis and enterotoxigenic Escherichia coli (ETEC)

Escherichia coli